The Nurses  is a 1984 Czech comedy film directed by Karel Kachyňa based on the novel by Adolf Branald.

Cast
 Alena Mihulová as Nurse Marie Sahulová
 Jiřina Jirásková as Old Nurse
 Ondřej Vetchý as Horsekeeper Petr
 Oldřich Vízner as Ambulance driver Arnošt
 František Husák as Physician
 Jiří Růžička as Gamekeeper Krákora

References

External links

Czechoslovak comedy films
Czech comedy films
1984 comedy films
1980s Czech films